Anjuta is an integrated development environment written for the GNOME project. It has support for C, C++, Java, JavaScript, Python and Vala programming language.

Anjuta DevStudio
The goal of Anjuta DevStudio is to provide a customizable and extensible IDE framework and at the same time provide implementations of common development tools. Libanjuta is the framework that realizes the Anjuta IDE plugin framework and Anjuta DevStudio realizes many of the common development plugins.

It integrates programming tools such as the Glade Interface Designer and the Devhelp API help browser.

Features
Anjuta features:
 Interactive debugger built over GDB and integrated compiler
 Source code editor with source browsing,
 code completion and syntax highlighting,
 Project management
 Application wizard
 CVS and Subversion version control system integration

Reception
The German magazine LinuxUser recognized Anjuta 1.0.0 (released in 2002) as a good step to increase the number of native GNOME/GTK applications, stating that the application has a very intuitive GUI and new useful features.

In April 2017, Anjuta was removed from the OpenBSD ports tree, with stagnation of development and existence of alternatives cited as reasons.

See also

 Comparison of integrated development environments
 List of GNOME applications

References

Further reading
 

Free integrated development environments
GNOME Developer Tools
Integrated development environments that use GTK
Linux integrated development environments